The Secrets is a 2007 Israeli drama film directed by Avi Nesher.

Synopsis 

Noemi is a young devoted Jewish girl who has just lost her mother and who is close to celebrate a marriage imposed by her father. Maybe as a result of the recent lost or maybe because of her interest in the Scriptures, but also because of her lack of feelings towards the future husband (with whom she does not even like to spend time in the same room), the young girl asks her father for the possibility to keep studying the Torah by following a girl's seminary. Arrived at Safed college, she immediately makes friend with the other students except for the rebellious Michelle, who seems to lack every interest in studying. Yet, the seminary students are assigned the task of helping the city's needy people as part of their spiritual formation and Noemi and Michelle are told to work together. The two of them are sent to take care of old Mrs Anouk, an old lady suffering from cancer and heart problems who, in the past, has betrayed her husband and committed pre-intentional murder. For her, who is close to death, there seems to be no way to escape the harsh divine Judgment, until Noemi and Michelle (who have in the meanwhile become very close friends, to the point of engaging in sexual intercourse) find the right methods to cleanse her from her sins through the holy Scriptures. But as they have broken the same Laws not giving a chance to Mrs Anouk (who in the meanwhile has died of heart attack in a hospital, comforted by the two girls), Noemi and Michelle are both expelled from the school. Concerning sexual intercourse between two women, Noemi convinces Michelle that there's nothing sinful about them as the Torah only forbids (or at least she thinks so) homosexual relationships involving two men. At the same time, Michelle is openly courted by a young pharmacist and musician, Yanki, who goes as far as asking her to get married. She agrees causing Noemi to go mad, as she had previously asked her to go live together. A few days later, Yanki shows up at Noemi's new home in order to invite her to the wedding, telling her it would be important for Michelle as she loves her even more than she loves him. As an answer, the girl, enraged by jealousy, throws a jar at him, slightly hurting his cheek, and asks him to leave her alone. The wedding is celebrated, Noemi being there, the wound still visible on the groom's cheek. The two girls make peace and dance together: their love story is over, but their friendship is not.

Cast
Ania Bukstein as Noemi
 as Michelle
Fanny Ardant as Anouk
Adir Miller as Yanki
 as Michael
Alma Zack as Racheli
Dana Ivgy as Sigi
Sefi Rivlin as Rabbi Hess
Rivka Michaeli as Mrs. Meizlish

Reception
It was nominated for Outstanding Film – Limited Release at the 21st GLAAD Media Awards. The movie was featured on Autostraddle as one of "8 Pretty Great Lesbian Movies You Haven’t Seen Yet."

See also 
 Eyes Wide Open
 Red Cow
 Disobedience

References

External links

Films directed by Avi Nesher
Israeli LGBT-related films
Lesbian-related films
2007 drama films
Israeli drama films
2007 LGBT-related films
2007 films
Films about Orthodox and Hasidic Jews
Films about LGBT and Judaism